All Saints' Church is the parish church for Fawley in the county of Hampshire.  It is one of the three original medieval parish churches along the area to the west of Southampton Water know locally as the Waterside.

History
The current building dates from the twelfth century and appears to been built over two periods, 1170–1210 and 1300–1340. There is reference to an earlier church, likely to be on this site, dating from 971 and possibly some parts were reused in the current building

The oldest part of the church is St Nicholas's Chapel, and there is conjecture this was also the original dedication of the church. A porch was added to the west entrance in 1840.

Bombing in World War 2

The church was bombed in 1940 and was badly damaged losing all of its medieval stained glass.  It wasn't until 1954 before the church was repaired and reconsecrated.

There is a plaque in the church dedicated to the rector who helped in the restoration and re-dedication of the church.

The plaque reads:In memory of The Revd. John Mearing rector 1947-1960 by whose inspiration this church was restored and re-dedicated 12. September 1954 after severe damage by enemy action 23. November 1940In the west window of St Nicholas's chapel there is a collage made from recovered stained glass.

Tombs & Memorials

Flight Lieutenant Samuel Kinkead
Samuel Kinkead was a South African fighter ace from the First World War and Schneider Trophy pilot who died whilst attempting to break the airspeed record in 1928.

Bells
The church now has six bells dating from 1603.  The four earlier bells were rehung and augmented in 1909 with two extra trebles

All weights provided by Robert Parker (Bellhanger) in August 2007, when the bells were rehung.

References

External links
All Saints' Church on Hampshire Churches website
All Saints' Church on Hampshire Church windows website

12th-century establishments in England
Grade I listed churches in Hampshire
12th-century church buildings in England